Dąbrówka Górna  (German Dombrowka an der Oder, 1938:1945 Eichtal) is a village in the administrative district of Gmina Krapkowice, within Krapkowice County, Opole Voivodeship, in south-western Poland.

Population 
The village has a population of 1,000.

External links 
 Jewish Community in Dąbrówka Górna on Virtual Shtetl

References

Villages in Krapkowice County